Tritons are a fictional species in the Dungeons & Dragons fantasy role-playing game.

Publication history
The tritons were introduced to the Dungeons & Dragons game in its first supplement, Greyhawk (1975), and also appeared in the Eldritch Wizardry supplement.

The triton appeared in the first edition of Advanced Dungeons & Dragons in the original Monster Manual (1977).

The triton appeared in the Dungeons & Dragons adventure module The War Rafts of Kron (1984). The triton also appeared in the Creature Catalogue (1986), and reprinted in the Creature Catalog (1993). The triton appeared as a player character class in The Sea People (1990).

The triton appeared in the second edition of Advanced Dungeons & Dragons in the Monstrous Compendium Volume Two (1989), and reprinted in the Monstrous Manual (1993). The triton appeared as a playable character race for the Forgotten Realms setting in Sea of Fallen Stars (1999).

The triton appeared in the third edition Monster Manual (2000), and in the 3.5 revised Monster Manual (2003). The triton appeared as a player character race in Savage Species (2003),

The triton was added as a playable race for Dungeons & Dragons 5th Edition in Volo's Guide to Monsters (2016).

Description
Tritons are aquatic humanoid creatures, loosely based on the merman god Triton from Greek mythology. 
Tritons resemble aquatic elves in their upper half, but their lower halves are more fish-like, with scaly legs and webbed feet. They favor tridents over other weapons.

Tritons are of the outsider type but native to the Material Plane, though they are thought to originate from the Elemental Plane of Water.  Tritons are able to magically summon water elementals and other creatures of the sea to come to their aid.

A triton is usually neutral in alignment.  They are the natural enemies of the sahuagin.

Society
Tritons worship the deity Persana.

References

Dungeons & Dragons humanoids
Triton (mythology)